Saint-Simon, Quebec, may mean any of the following Canadian locations:

Saint-Simon, Bas-Saint-Laurent, Quebec
Saint-Simon-sur-Mer, Quebec (a community within the above)
Saint-Simon, Montérégie, Quebec
Saint-Simon-de-Bagot, Quebec (a community within the above)
Saint-Simon-les-Mines, Quebec

See also 
 Saint-Siméon, Quebec (disambiguation)